Exo-poly-alpha-galacturonosidase (exopolygalacturonosidase, exopolygalacturanosidase, poly(1,4-alpha-D-galactosiduronate) digalacturonohydrolase) is an enzyme with systematic name poly((1->4)-alpha-D-galactosiduronate) digalacturonohydrolase. This enzyme catalyses the following chemical reaction

 Hydrolysis of pectic acid from the non-reducing end, releasing digalacturonate

References

External links 
 

EC 3.2.1